The Rivelaunbach is a stream in South Tyrol, Italy.

References 

Civic Network of South Tyrol 

Rivers of South Tyrol
Rivers of Italy